The legislative districts of Ilocos Norte are the representations of the province of Ilocos Norte in the various national legislatures of the Philippines. The province is currently represented in the lower house of the Congress of the Philippines through its first and second congressional districts.

The first and second districts of Ilocos Norte are among the original representative districts from 1907 which has never changed in territorial coverage, along with the first districts of Albay, of Ilocos Sur and of Iloilo.

History 
The province has been divided into two districts since 1907. When seats for the upper house of the Philippine Legislature were elected from territory-based districts between 1916 and 1935, the province formed part of the first senatorial district which elected two out of the 24-member senate.

In the disruption caused by the Second World War, two delegates represented the province in the National Assembly of the Japanese-sponsored Second Philippine Republic: one was the provincial governor (an ex officio member), while the other was elected through a provincial assembly of KALIBAPI members during the Japanese occupation of the Philippines. Upon the restoration of the Philippine Commonwealth in 1945, the province continued to comprise two representative districts.

Ilocos Norte was represented in the Interim Batasang Pambansa as part of Region I from 1978 to 1984, and returned two representatives, elected at-large to the Regular Batasang Pambansa from 1984 to 1986. The province retained its two congressional districts under the new Constitution which was proclaimed on February 11, 1987, and elected members to the restored House of Representatives starting that same year.

1st District 

City: Laoag (became city 1965)
Municipalities: Bacarra, Bangui, Pasuquin, Piddig, Sarrat (San Miguel), Vintar (re-established 1909), Burgos (Nagparitan) (re-established 1913), Pagudpud (established 1959), Adams (established 1983), Carasi (established 1983), Dumalneg (established 1983)
Population (2020):  311,977

Notes

2nd District 

City: Batac (became city 2007)
Municipalities: Badoc, Dingras, Paoay, San Nicolas (re-established 1909), Solsona (re-established 1909), Banna (Espiritu) (established 1913), Nueva Era (established 1919), Pinili (established 1919), Currimao (established 1920), Marcos (established 1963)
Population (2020):  297,611

Notes

At-Large (defunct)

References 

Ilocos Norte
Politics of Ilocos Norte